Jackie Murray is Associate Professor of Classics at the University of Kentucky and at Buffalo University, New York. She is an expert on imperial Greek literature, Hellenistic poetry, and the reception of Classics in African American and Afro-Caribbean literature.

Education 
Murray received her PhD in ancient philosophy from the University of Washington in 2005. Her doctoral thesis was entitled Polyphonic Argo. Murray completed her BA at the University of Guelph in Classical Studies and Latin, and she was awarded an MA in classics from the University of Western Ontario.

Career 
Murray's published research focuses on Roman and Hellenistic literature, especially Apollonius, and race and ethnicity in the ancient world.

Murray received the Andrew Heiskell/National Endowment for the Humanities Post-Doctoral Rome Prize from the American Academy in Rome (2011–12). She was the first black woman to be awarded the Rome Prize in ancient studies. Her research project focused on Apollonius’ Argonautica. Since then she has held a Margo Tytus Fellowship for Visiting Scholars at the University of Cincinnati (2017), a Scholarship and Fellowship at the Center for Hellenic Studies, Harvard University (2018 and 2020), and a Deutscher Akademischer Austauschdienst (DAAD) Fellowship in 2021.

Murray is currently the John P. Birkelund Fellow in the Humanities at the American Academy in Berlin (Fall 2022). She will begin a new position as associate professor in the Department of Classics at the University at Buffalo (SUNY) in 2023.

References

External links 
 BBC Radio 4, 'Detoxifying Classics', with Katherine Harloe: Detoxifying the Classics - BBC Sounds
 Interview with Jackie Murray, American Academy in Rome: Jackie Murray interview
 John P. Birkelund Lecture: The Idea and Image of Slavery in Plato’s Phaedo

Women classical scholars
Living people
University of Guelph alumni
University of Kentucky faculty
Classics educators
Year of birth missing (living people)
American classical scholars
University of Washington alumni
University at Buffalo faculty
University of Western Ontario alumni